Rani Birla Girls’ College, established in 1961, is a girls' undergraduate arts college in Kolkata, West Bengal, India. It is affiliated with the University of Calcutta. It was founded by B. M. Birla family

Departments

Arts
English
Hindi
History
Geography
Political science
Philosophy
Economics
Education
Sociology
Communicative English
Journalism & mass communication
Fashion & apparel design

Accreditation
Rani Birla Girls’ College is recognized by the University Grants Commission (UGC) and has also received NAAC recommendations.

Notable alumni
Raima Sen, actress

See also 
List of colleges affiliated to the University of Calcutta
Education in India
Education in West Bengal

References

External links
Rani Birla Girls’ College

Educational institutions established in 1961
University of Calcutta affiliates
Universities and colleges in Kolkata
Women's universities and colleges in West Bengal
1961 establishments in West Bengal